Cittaslow is an organisation founded in Italy and inspired by the slow food movement. Cittaslow's goals include improving the quality of life in towns by slowing down its overall pace, especially in a city's use of spaces and the flow of life and traffic through them.

History
Cittaslow was founded in Italy in October 1999, following a meeting organised by the mayor of Greve in Chianti, Tuscany. A 54-point charter was developed, encouraging high quality local food and drink, general conviviality and the opposition to cultural standardisation. In 2001, 28 Italian towns were signed up to the pledge, certified by trained operatives of Cittaslow. The first Slow City in the English-speaking world was Ludlow, England, in 2003. The movement expanded broadly beyond Italy and, by 2006, national Cittaslow networks existed in Germany, Norway and the United Kingdom. By mid-2009, fourteen countries had at least one officially accredited Cittaslow community. In July 2009, the small seaside village of Cowichan Bay in Canada became the North American continent's first Cittaslow town. In October 2020, Izmir, Turkey's 3rd metropolitan municipality, has become The First Cittaslow Metropolis of the World.

Membership 
There are three categories of membership: Cittaslow town (population less than 50,000); Cittaslow Supporter (population more than 50,000); and Cittaslow Friend (individual or family).

Like Slow Food, Cittaslow is a membership organisation. Full membership of Cittaslow is only open to towns with a population under 50,000. To become eligible for membership, a town must normally score at least 50 percent in a self-assessment process against the set of Cittaslow goals, and then apply for admission to the appropriate Cittaslow national network. An annual membership fee is payable by towns.

The first town in England to become a Cittaslow city (and the first in the English-speaking world) was Ludlow in November 2003; the first in Wales was Mold. There are currently three towns in the UK that are members.

By 2007, several slow cities had been introduced across South Korea.

Pijao, a small town in Colombia, is to become the first Cittaslow city in Latin America.

Members

The goals and aims 
There are 50 goals and principles that each Cittaslow town commits to work to achieve. They serve as benchmarks to improve the quality of life in each city.

The main aims of the movement are:
making life better for everyone living in an urban environment
improving the quality of life in the cities
resisting the homogenization and globalization of towns around the globe
protecting the environment
promoting cultural diversity and uniqueness of individual cities
providing inspiration for a healthier lifestyle

See also
 Slow food
 Slow architecture
Slow Photography
Carlo Petrini

References

External links
 

 
Slow movement